The 2013 Davis Cup World Group Play-offs were held from September 13 to 15. They were the main play-offs of the 2013 Davis Cup. Winners of the playoffs advanced to the 2014 World Group, and the losers were relegated to their respective Zonal Regions I.

Teams
Bold indicates team has qualified for the 2014 Davis Cup World Group.

 From World Group

 From Americas Group I

 From Asia/Oceania Group I

 From Europe/Africa Group I

Results
Date: 13–15 September

The eight losing teams in the World Group first round ties and eight winners of the Zonal Group I final round ties competed in the World Group Play-offs for spots in the 2014 World Group. The draw took place April 11 in London.

Seeded teams

 
 
 
 
 
 
 
 

Unseeded teams

 
 
 
 
  
 
 
 

Playoff results

Spain vs. Ukraine

Netherlands vs. Austria

Croatia vs. Great Britain

Switzerland vs. Ecuador

Germany vs. Brazil

Poland vs. Australia

Belgium vs. Israel

Japan vs. Colombia

References

World Group Play-offs